Willem Baptist (1979) is a Dutch filmmaker and documentary-director.

His documentary I’m Never Afraid! (2010) won a Golden Gate Award at San Francisco International Film Festival, Documentary Short Grand Jury Prize at Atlanta Film Festival, and a Kinderkast Jury award non-fiction at Cinekid Festival. His documentary Wild Boar (2013) had its international premieres in competition at respectively Visions du Réel (Switzerland), Hot Docs International Documentary Festival (Canada) and AFI Docs (USA).

In 2016 Imposible Magazine reported Baptist was shooting a feature documentary titled Instant Dreams in Berlin and California. Instant Dreams will have its premiere at the International Documentary Film Festival Amsterdam in 2017, where it will be competing in the First Appearance Competition and Dutch Documentary Competition.

In 2018 The Saugatuck Center for the Arts, present the Midwest premiere of the Instant Dreams documentary at 7 p.m. Friday, October 19, and was a feature an on-site Polaroid portrait studio in the lobby.

References

External links
 
 

1979 births
Living people
Dutch film directors